Richard Clayton may refer to:

 Richard Clayton (actor) (1915–2008), American actor
 Richard Clayton (academic) (died 1676), academic and administrator at University College, Oxford
 Richard Clayton (Royal Navy officer) (1925–1984)
 Richard Clayton (dean of Peterborough) (died 1612), English churchman and academic
 Richard Rice Clayton (1798–1879), Member of Parliament for Aylesbury, 1841–1847
 Richard Clayton (Irish judge) (1702–1770), Member of Parliament for Wigan, 1747–1754
Sir Richard Clayton, 1st Baronet (1745–1828), English translator

See also
Dick Clayton (disambiguation)
 Clayton Richard (born 1983), American baseball pitcher
 Clayton (disambiguation)